Acianthera prolifera is a species of orchid.

It is native to the Atlantic Forest ecoregion in southeastern Brazil.

References

External links

prolifera
Orchids of Brazil
Flora of the Atlantic Forest